Doliops gertrudis is a species of beetle in the family Cerambycidae, described by Karl-Ernst Hüdepohl in 1990.

References

Doliops
Beetles described in 1990